Ricardo González Bango (born 18 September 1968) is a Spanish retired footballer who played as a midfielder, and a current coach.

External links
 
 
 
 
 Sporting de Gijón biography 
 

1968 births
Living people
Footballers from Gijón
Spanish footballers
Association football midfielders
La Liga players
Segunda División players
Tercera División players
Colegio de la Inmaculada (Gijón) footballers
Real Oviedo Vetusta players
Real Oviedo players
Sevilla FC players
Sporting de Gijón players
Liga MX players
Club Celaya footballers
Spain under-21 international footballers
Spain international footballers
Spanish expatriate footballers
Expatriate footballers in Mexico
Spanish expatriate sportspeople in Mexico
Spanish football managers
Real Avilés CF managers
Colegio de la Inmaculada (Gijón) alumni